Tremacebus is an extinct genus of New World monkeys from the Early Miocene (Colhuehuapian in the SALMA classification). The type species is T. harringtoni.

Description 
However, its eyes appear to have been smaller than the modern species, CT scans of the cranium suggest a relatively small olfactory bulb and poor sense of smell, compared with night monkeys. These features suggest that it may not have been nocturnal.

Only a few fossils have been found, including a skull from the Sarmiento Formation, Patagonia.

References

External links 
 Mikko's Phylogeny Archive

Prehistoric monkeys
Monotypic prehistoric primate genera
Prehistoric primate genera
Miocene primates of South America
Colhuehuapian
Neogene Argentina
Fossils of Argentina
Fossil taxa described in 1974
Golfo San Jorge Basin
Sarmiento Formation